Flash Airlines Flight 604 was a charter flight provided by Egyptian private charter company Flash Airlines. On 3 January 2004, the Boeing 737-300 that was operating the route crashed into the Red Sea shortly after takeoff from Sharm El Sheikh International Airport, killing all 135 passengers, most of whom were French tourists, and all thirteen crew members. The findings of the crash investigation were controversial, with accident investigators from the different countries involved unable to agree on the cause of the accident.

Flight 604 was the deadliest air disaster in Egypt until it was surpassed almost twelve years later by the bombing of Metrojet Flight 9268. It remains the deadliest accident involving a 737 Classic aircraft.

History of the flight

Aircraft and crew 
The aircraft involved in the accident was an 11 year old Boeing 737-3Q8 powered by two CFM56-3C1 engines. It was built by Boeing at its Renton factory in Renton, Washington and made its first flight on 9 October 1992 before it was delivered to TACA International Airlines as N373TA on 22 October 1992. It operated with TACA until it was retired and then delivered to the then-newly founded Norwegian low-cost carrier Color Air on 28 May 1998 as G-COLB, operating for British aviation company Air Foyle, and named Trondheim, before Color Air commenced operations on 1 August that year. After Color Air ceased operations on 27 September 1999, G-COLB was leased by the International Lease Finance Corporation as N161LF on 22 November, before it was purchased by Heliopolis Airlines on 21 April 2000, and was given the registration SU-ZCE and named Shaza. It operated briefly with Heliopolis Airlines before being leased by the ILFC once again, this time under the registration N221LF on 17 May. It was then purchased by Egyptian low-cost carrier Mediterranean Airlines on 10 July under its new registration SU-MBA, named Cataract and operated with the carrier before it ceased operations sometime in 2001. Still wearing the livery of Mediterranean Airlines, SU-MBA was purchased by Heliopolis Airlines once again on 23 June and given the final registration SU-ZCF. It had been operated by Heliopolis Airlines until its name was changed to Flash Airlines on 22 July. Since its purchase and subsequent airline renaming, SU-ZCF wore the livery of short-lived Mediterranean Airlines with the patched Flash Airlines logo on the body as well as the small Flash Group logo with the text reading Member of FLASH Group above and below patched over the logo of Mediterranean Airlines on the tail before it was replaced by the large logo. The large text on the rear of body reading FLASH AIRLINES was added slightly later in late 2001. It did not acquire the name Nour until sometime in 2003, when the livery was changed with the replacement of the red and blue stripes with a grey belly with a dark blue belly with a single dark blue stripe and the addition of the text Member of the FLASH Group under the windows and the body logo. At the time of the accident, it had accumulated 25,600 flight hours and 18,000 cycles of takeoffs and landings.

The captain of Flight 604 was 53-year-old Khadr Abdullah (referred to as Mohammed Khedr in a Times Online article). He was a highly respected pilot who had accrued almost 7,500 hours of flight time, including 474 hours on the Boeing 737. The first officer was 25-year-old Amr Al-Shaafei who had fewer than 800 hours of flying experience, with 242 of them on the Boeing 737. 42-year-old Ashraf Abdelhamid, who was training as a first officer and had experience flying corporate jets, sat in the cockpit with the pilot and co-pilot. Though Egyptian, Abdelhamid also held Canadian and U.S. citizenships.

Passengers 
Most of the passengers aboard the flight were French tourists from the Paris metropolitan area. A provisional passenger list, dated 5 January 2004, stated that twelve entire French families had boarded the flight. Members of twelve families appeared at Charles de Gaulle Airport to meet passengers off the flight; this gave an indication to the airport staff that entire families had died on Flight 604.

Accident 
The aircraft departed from Sharm El Sheikh International Airport at 04:42 EET (02:42 UTC) on 3 January 2004. After taking off, it made a left turn to intercept the airport's VOR system, and the autopilot was then engaged.

Shortly afterwards, however, Captain Abdullah made an unintelligible exclamation and the autopilot abruptly disconnected (this might have been an intentional action by the pilots or it may have happened automatically). At this point the aircraft entered a right bank of 40 degrees. When the bank reached 50 degrees, First Officer Al-Shaafei called out "overbank," indicating that the aircraft's bank was becoming dangerous. The bank angle increased rapidly until it reached 111 degrees at which point the aircraft entered a stall. The tail broke off of the plane and rolled forward after the crash into the sea. All 148 people on board perished.

Investigation 
Initially, it was thought that terrorists might have been involved, as fear of aviation terrorism was high (with several major airlines in previous days cancelling flights on short notice). The British Prime Minister at the time, Tony Blair, was also on holiday in the Sharm El Sheikh area. A group in Yemen said that it destroyed the aircraft as a protest against a new law in France banning headscarves in schools. Accident investigators dismissed terrorism when they discovered that the wreckage was in a tight debris field, indicating that the aircraft crashed in one piece; a bombed aircraft would have disintegrated and left a large debris field.

However two weeks after the accident, both devices were located by a French salvage vessel and recovered by a ROV. The accident investigators examined the recorders while in Cairo. The maintenance records of the aircraft had not been duplicated; they were destroyed in the crash and no backup copies existed.

The Ministry of Civil Aviation (MCA) investigated the accident, with assistance from the American National Transportation Safety Board (NTSB) and the French Bureau of Enquiry and Analysis for Civil Aviation Safety (BEA).

The MCA released its final report into the accident on 25 March 2006. The report did not conclude with a probable cause, listing instead four "possible causes."

The NTSB and the BEA concluded that the pilot suffered spatial disorientation and the copilot was unwilling to challenge his more experienced superior. Furthermore, according to the NTSB and BEA, both officers were insufficiently trained. The NTSB stated that the cockpit voice recorder showed that 24 seconds passed after the airliner banked before the pilot began corrective maneuvers. Egyptian authorities disagreed with this assessment, instead blaming mechanical issues. Shaker Kelada, the lead Egyptian investigator, said that if Hamid, who had more experience than the copilot, detected any problems with the flight, he would have raised objections. Some media reports suggest that the plane crashed due to technical problems, possibly a result of the airline's apparently questionable safety record. This attitude was shown in a press briefing given by the BEA chief who was berated by the first officer's mother during a press conference, and demanded that the crew be absolved of fault prior to the completion of the investigation. Two months after the crash, Flash Airlines declared bankruptcy.

According to an excerpt from page five of the U.S.'s comments on the final report of this accident:

"Distraction. A few seconds before the captain called for the autopilot to be engaged, the aircraft's pitch began increasing and airspeed began decreasing. These deviations continued during and after the autopilot engagement/disengagement sequence. During this time, the captain also allowed the aircraft to enter a gradually steepening right bank, which was inconsistent with the flight crew's departure clearance to perform a climbing left turn. These pitch, airspeed and bank angle deviations indicated that the captain directed his attention away from monitoring the attitude indications during and after the autopilot disengagement process.
Changes in the autoflight system's mode status offer the best explanation for the captain's distraction. The following changes occurred in the autoflight system's mode status shortly before the initiation of the right roll: (1) manual engagement of the autopilot, (2) automatic transition of roll guidance from heading select to control wheel steering-roll (CWS-R), (3) manual disengagement of the autopilot, and (4) manual reengagement of heading select for roll guidance. The transition to the CWS-R mode occurred in accordance with nominal system operation because the captain was not closely following the flight director guidance at the time of the autopilot engagement. The captain might not have expected the transition, and he might not have understood why it occurred. The captain was probably referring to the mode change from command mode to CWS-R when he stated, "see what the aircraft did?," shortly after it occurred. The available evidence indicates that the unexpected mode change and the flight crew's subsequent focus of attention on reestablishing roll guidance for the autoflight system were the most likely reasons for the captain's distraction from monitoring the attitude."

Problems associated with the complexity of autopilot systems were documented in the June 2008 issue of Aero Safety World. Before the completion of the investigation, Avionics writer David Evans suggested that differences in artificial horizon instrumentation between the MiG-21 (with which the captain had experience) and the Boeing 737 may have contributed to the crash.

In popular culture
The Discovery Channel Canada / National Geographic TV series Mayday (also called Air Crash Investigation or Air Emergency) depicted the accident in a 2007 episode titled "Vertigo".

See also 
 Gulf Air Flight 072
 Pan Am Flight 816
 Adam Air Flight 574
 Air India Flight 855
 Viasa Flight 897
 EgyptAir Flight 804
 Lion Air Flight 610
 Sriwijaya Air Flight 182
 John F. Kennedy Jr. plane crash
 The Day the Music Died

References

External links
 Ministry of Civil Aviation (Egypt): Flash Accident Final Report (Archive)

 Final report file (Archive) 
 Interim report file (Archive) 
 Bureau of Enquiry and Analysis for Civil Aviation Safety
 "Sea Search Operations." (Archive)
 Information and press releases 
 Cockpit Voice Recorder transcript and accident summary

2004 disasters in Egypt
Airliner accidents and incidents caused by instrument failure
Airliner accidents and incidents caused by pilot error
Aviation accident investigations with disputed causes
Aviation accidents and incidents in 2004
Aviation accidents and incidents in Egypt
2004 in Egypt
2004 in France
Egypt–France relations
Accidents and incidents involving the Boeing 737 Classic
History of Sharm El Sheikh
Marine salvage operations
January 2004 events in Africa